Dapanoptera is a genus of crane fly in the family Limoniidae.

Species
D. auroatra (Walker, 1864)
D. candidata (Alexander, 1942)
D. carolina (Edwards, 1932)
D. cermaki (Theischinger, 1996)
D. fascipennis de Meijere, 1913
D. gressittiana (Alexander, 1962)
D. hipmilta (Theischinger, 1994)
D. latifascia (Walker, 1865)
D. meijereana (Alexander, 1942)
D. percelestis (Alexander, 1959)
D. perdecora (Walker, 1861)
D. plenipennis (Walker, 1865)
D. richmondiana Skuse, 1896
D. torricelliana (Alexander, 1947)
D. toxopaeana (Alexander, 1959)
D. versteegi de Meijere, 1915
D. virago (Alexander, 1959)

References

Limoniidae
Nematocera genera